Barrois is a  (a French territorial division roughly equivalent to a county) in eastern France. In the Middle Ages it was part of the Duchy of Bar, then bordering the Duchy of Lorraine.

External links
Pays Barrois official website (in French)

Former provinces of France